The Croce Domini Pass (el. 1892 m.) is a high mountain pass in the Alps in the region of Lombardy in Italy.

It connects the Lago d'Idro in the southeast and the Lago d'Iseo in the southwest.

The pass road has a maximum grade of 12 percent and is paved from Breno to Bagolino. The pass is closed from November to May.

See also
 List of highest paved roads in Europe
 List of mountain passes

Mountain passes of Italy
Mountain passes of the Alps